José Grande (born 4 October 1944) is a Spanish former racing cyclist. He rode in three editions of the Tour de France, five of the Giro d'Italia and three of the Vuelta a España.

Major results
1971
 3rd Overall Vuelta a Asturias
1972
 3rd Overall Vuelta a Asturias
1973
 1st GP Viscaya
 2nd GP Pascuas
1974
 1st Overall Vuelta a los Valles Mineros
 1st Overall Vuelta a Segovia

References

External links
 

1944 births
Living people
Spanish male cyclists
Sportspeople from the Province of Albacete
Cyclists from Castilla-La Mancha